2018 Women's Volleyball Thai–Denmark Super League was the 6th edition of the tournament. It was held at the MCC Hall of The Mall Bangkapi in Bangkok, Thailand from 28 March – 1 April 2018.

Teams

Foreign players

Pools composition

Preliminary round

Pool A

|}

|}

Pool B

|}

|}

Final round

Semifinals

|}

Final

|}

Final standing

See also 
 2018 Men's Volleyball Thai–Denmark Super League

References

Women's,2018
Volleyball,Thai-Denmark Super League
Thai-Denmark Super League